was a town located in Minamiakita District, Akita Prefecture, Japan.

In 2003, the town had an estimated population of 22,115 and a density of 532.76 persons per km². The total area was 41.51 km².

On March 22, 2005, Tennō, along with the towns of Iitagawa and Shōwa (all from Minamiakita District), merged to create the city of Katagami.

Noted people from Tennō
Koji Futada, politician
Kenichi Kaga, professional soccer player
Kōsei Yoshida, professional baseball player

External links
 Katagami official website

References

Dissolved municipalities of Akita Prefecture
Katagami, Akita